Tartu Public Library is a public library in Tartu, Estonia.

Its predecessor was the library which was established in 1913 by Tartu Rahvaraamatukogu Selts. The City Library was established in 1920. In 1928, this library was named into the Central City Library. In 1936, new rooms were finished in Kompanii Street (nowadays, the library is also located in Kompanii Street).

Between 1936 and 1937, the library has about 36,000 volumes.

Between 1952 and 1987, the library was named in honor of Nikolai Gogol.

Directors:
 1951–1975 Eljo Kaldalu
 1975–1983 Elle Tarik
 1983–2001 Tiit Jänese 
 2001–2020 Asko Tamme
 2020-... Piret Talur.

References

External links
 

Libraries in Estonia
Tartu
Libraries established in 1913